Thomas Edward Lehman (born March 7, 1959) is an American professional golfer. A former number 1 ranked golfer, his tournament wins include one major title, the 1996 Open Championship; and he is the only golfer in history to have been awarded the Player of the Year honor on all three PGA Tours: the regular PGA Tour, the Web.com Tour and the PGA Tour Champions.

Amateur career
Born in Austin, Minnesota, and raised in Alexandria, Lehman played college golf at the University of Minnesota in Minneapolis–Saint Paul, graduated with a degree in business/accounting, and turned professional in 1982.

Professional career
It took Lehman many years to become a leading tour professional. He played on the PGA Tour with little success from 1983 to 1985, and was then obliged to play elsewhere for the following six seasons. This included time in Asia and South Africa and on the second tier Ben Hogan Tour in the United States. He regained his PGA Tour card by topping the Ben Hogan Tour's 1991 money list, and enjoyed unbroken membership of the PGA Tour from 1992 until shortly after he joined the Champions Tour. He was named PGA Tour Player of the Year in 1996.

From 1995 to 1997, Lehman held the 54-hole lead at the U.S. Open, but each time failed to win. During this period he won his only major championship to date, The Open Championship in 1996. In April 1997, he was Number 1 in the Official World Golf Ranking for what would be only one week. He has won five times on the PGA Tour, but in addition to his Open win these wins have included the season-ending Tour Championship and Memorial Tournament, and he has won at least nineteen professional events in total.

Although Lehman did not win a lot of tournaments on the PGA Tour he was one of the most consistent players on tour with 19 runner-up finishes between 1992 and 2006.

Unusually for a star American golfer, Lehman won almost as many regular tour events internationally as he did in the United States. His most well-known victory was at the 1996 Open Championship in England. He also won the 1993 Casio World Open on the Japan Golf Tour and the 1997 Gulfstream Loch Lomond World Invitational on the European Tour. He also recorded runner-up finishes at the 1989 South African Open and the 2000 Scottish Open, the European Tour event he won three years previous.

Lehman was captain of the Ryder Cup team in 2006, which lost 18½ to 9½ to Europe at the K Club in Ireland.

In April 2009, Lehman became the 13th Champions Tour player to win his debut tournament. He teamed with Bernhard Langer to win the Liberty Mutual Legends of Golf in a playoff over Jeff Sluman and Craig Stadler. On May 30, 2010, Lehman won the Senior PGA Championship in a playoff over Fred Couples and David Frost for his first Champions Tour major championship. In 2011, Lehman topped the Champions Tour money list and was voted the Champions Tour Player of the Year. He is the first golfer to win "Player of the Year" honors on all three tours operated by the PGA Tour. 

In June 2012, Lehman defended his title at the Regions Tradition, to win his third senior major championship. He won by two strokes from Germany's Bernhard Langer and Taiwan's Lu Chien-soon. In his next major appearance at the Senior Players Championship, he finished runner-up, two strokes behind Joe Daley.

Personal
Lehman and his wife Melissa have lived for many years in Scottsdale, Arizona, and they have four children: two daughters and two sons. Lehman is a devout Christian.

Amateur wins 
1981 Minnesota State Amateur

Professional wins (35)

PGA Tour wins (5)

PGA Tour playoff record (0–3)

European Tour wins (2)

Japan Golf Tour wins (1)

Ben Hogan Tour wins (4)

*Note: The 1991 Ben Hogan Gulf Coast Classic was shortened to 36 holes due to rain.

Ben Hogan Tour playoff record (2–2)

Tour de las Américas wins (1)

1Co-sanctioned by the TPG Tour

Other wins (10)

Other playoff record (0–1)

PGA Tour Champions wins (12)

*Note: The 2018 Principal Charity Classic was shortened to 36 holes due to weather.

PGA Tour Champions playoff record (3–2)

European Senior Tour wins (2)

European Senior Tour playoff record (1–0)

Major championships

Wins (1)

Results timeline

 

WD = Withdrew
CUT = missed the half-way cut
"T" indicates a tie for a place

Summary

Most consecutive cuts made – 8 (1996 Masters – 1997 PGA)
Longest streak of top-10s – 2 (1996 U.S. Open – 1996 Open Championship)

Results in The Players Championship

CUT = missed the halfway cut
"T" indicates a tie for a place

Results in World Golf Championships

1Cancelled due to 9/11

QF, R16, R32, R64 = Round in which player lost in match play
"T" = tied
NT = No tournament

Senior major championships

Wins (3)

Results timeline
Results not in chronological order before 2022.

CUT = missed the halfway cut
"T" indicates a tie for a place
NT = No tournament due to COVID-19 pandemic

Awards
Lehman has won the following awards:
1991 
Ben Hogan Tour leading money winner
Ben Hogan Tour Player of the Year
1996
PGA Player of the Year
PGA Tour Player of the Year
Vardon Trophy
Byron Nelson Award
PGA Tour leading money winner
2010 
Payne Stewart Award
2011 
Arnold Palmer Award (Champions Tour leading money winner)
Jack Nicklaus Trophy (Champions Tour Player of the Year)
Charles Schwab Cup (Champions Tour)
2012
Jack Nicklaus Trophy (Champions Tour Player of the Year)
Charles Schwab Cup (Champions Tour)

U.S. national team appearances
Ryder Cup: 1995, 1997, 1999 (winners), 2006 (non-playing captain)
Presidents Cup: 1994 (winners), 1996 (winners), 2000 (winners)
World Cup: 1996
Alfred Dunhill Cup: 1999, 2000
UBS Warburg Cup: 2002 (winners)
Wendy's 3-Tour Challenge (representing PGA Tour): 1997 (winners), 1999, 2012 (ChampionsTour)

See also
1982 PGA Tour Qualifying School graduates
1983 PGA Tour Qualifying School graduates
1984 PGA Tour Qualifying School graduates
1991 Ben Hogan Tour graduates
List of golfers with most PGA Tour Champions wins
List of golfers with most Web.com Tour wins

References

External links

Article from thesandtrap.com

American male golfers
Minnesota Golden Gophers men's golfers
PGA Tour golfers
PGA Tour Champions golfers
Ryder Cup competitors for the United States
Winners of men's major golf championships
Winners of senior major golf championships
Korn Ferry Tour graduates
Golfers from Minnesota
Golfers from Scottsdale, Arizona
People from Austin, Minnesota
People from Alexandria, Minnesota
1959 births
Living people